Ursula Bruhin (born 19 March 1970) is a Swiss snowboarder, World Champion in Parallel Giant Slalom in 2001 and 2003.

External links 
 UrsulaBruhin.ch
 Interview with Ursula Bruhin 

Swiss female snowboarders
Snowboarders at the 2006 Winter Olympics
1970 births
Living people
Olympic snowboarders of Switzerland
21st-century Swiss women